Henrik Daniel "Daja" Sjölund (born 22 April 1983) is a Finnish former footballer who played as a midfielder. He is best remembered for his stints with Djurgårdens IF and IFK Norrköping. He won 37 caps for the Finland national team.

Career

Daniel Sjölund was born in the municipality of Finström, based in Åland which is a Swedish-speaking autonomous region that belongs to Finland. Sjölund started his career at IF Finströms Kamraterna, when he was a child. Afterwards he went to IFK Mariehamn and IF Brommapojkarna, before being signed by West Ham at the age of just 16, after impressive displays for Finland's youth teams. In 2000 Liverpool manager Gérard Houllier agreed to pay £1 million for the talented forward in a deal that also saw Rigobert Song going the other way. After failing to get into the first team at Liverpool, Sjölund joined Djurgården for the 2003 season, first on loan and later on a permanent deal. He has won two Swedish championships and two Swedish Cups with Djurgården. The 2005 season finally saw Sjölund become a regular in the Djurgården team, and he scored seven goals in the league.

A regular for the Under-21s since the age of 17, Sjölund made his senior international debut for the Finnish national team on 22 May 2003 against Norway. Good performances in the 2005 season have seen him promoted to the senior team on a regular basis. Sjölund was also a part of the Finland squad at the 2001 FIFA World Youth Championship.

In September 2012 Sjölund played his 200th league game for Djurgården wearing a number 200 shirt. But only a couple of months later the club announced that they would not be extending his contract.

Sjölund signed with Åtvidabergs FF on 4 February 2013 and stayed with the club for two seasons. He signed a pre-contract with local rivals IFK Norrköping during the 2014 season, and joined the squad for the 2015 season.

Sjölund re-signed with IFK Mariehamn for the 2019 season. In mid October, it was announced that Sjölund had retired from football.

Sjölund returned to playing after less than a year of retirement, this time with Finnish fourth-tier club FC Åland. In November 2021 Sjölund announced that he had signed a three year contract to manage FC Åland.

Personal information
His sister Annica Sjölund is also a Finnish international who competed in Women's Euro 2009.

Career statistics

International goals

International

Honours

Club

 Djurgårdens IF

 Allsvenskan (2): 2003, 2005
 Svenska Cupen (2): 2004, 2005

 IFK Norrköping

 Allsvenskan (1): 2015

Individual
 Swedish Goal of the Year (1): 2005
 Årets Järnkamin (1): 2008

References

External links
 
  

IFK Mariehamn profile

1983 births
Living people
People from Finström
Swedish-speaking Finns
Finnish footballers
Finland international footballers
Finland youth international footballers
Association football forwards
IF Brommapojkarna players
West Ham United F.C. players
Liverpool F.C. players
Djurgårdens IF Fotboll players
IFK Mariehamn players
Expatriate footballers in England
Finnish expatriate sportspeople in England
Expatriate footballers in Sweden
Finnish expatriate sportspeople in Sweden
Finnish expatriate footballers
Allsvenskan players
Veikkausliiga players
Sportspeople from Åland